The Kumho Art Hall is a classical music hall in Seoul, South Korea.

General
Kumho Art Hall is situated in the heart of downtown Seoul on the third floor of Daewoo E&C. Performances are held more than five times a week; three of these are part of a planned series by Kumho Asiana Cultural Foundation: 'Beautiful Thursday Concert Series', 'Kumho Prodigy Concert Series', and 'Kumho Young Artist Concert Series'. Performances are held every day of the year at Kumho Art Hall, ensuring that music never ceases to be heard in its space.

Beautiful Thursday Series
In June 1997, the late Seong-Yawng Park, Chairman of Kumho Asiana Cultural Foundation, launched what became known as the 'Gallery Concert', a novel concept at the time in that it was held in a music space, namely Kumho Museum of Art. The series provided musicians with a space in which to present their talent, while giving the public a chance to listen to classical music. Following the opening of Kumho Art Hall in December 2000, the gallery concert was reborn as the 'Friday Special Concert Series', which saw performances every Friday at its new abode. When this series celebrated its 10th anniversary in June 2007, it was renamed the 'Beautiful Thursday Series'. Established Korean artists, including Dong-Suk Kang, Daejin Kim, Kyung-wha Chung, Myung-wha Chung, and international musicians of note such as Jörg Demus, Heinz Holliger, Igor Ozim, Miriam Fried, and Matthew Barley, have performed there.

External links
 Official website

Jongno District
Arts centres in South Korea
Theatres in South Korea
Concert halls in South Korea
Culture of Seoul
Buildings and structures in Seoul